Mirkovce is a village and municipality in Prešov District in the Prešov Region of eastern Slovakia.

History
In historical records the village was first mentioned in 1320.

Geography

Population 
It has a population of about 1,393 people (2020-12-31).

References

External links
 
 
https://web.archive.org/web/20070513023228/http://www.statistics.sk/mosmis/eng/run.html

Villages and municipalities in Prešov District
Šariš
Romani communities in Slovakia